Dunfermline Burghs was a burgh constituency of the House of Commons of the Parliament of the United Kingdom from 1918 until 1974. It elected one Member of Parliament (MP) using the first-past-the-post voting system.

From 1918 to 1950 it was also, officially, a district of burghs constituency.

There was also a Dunfermline county constituency from 1974 to 1983.

Boundaries 

As defined in 1918 the constituency covered the parliamentary burghs of Dunfermline, Cowdenbeath, Inverkeithing, and Lochgelly. Prior to the constituency's creation, the burghs of Dunfermline and Inverkeithing had been represented as components of Stirling Burghs, while Cowdenbeath and Lochgelly were within the county constituency of West Fife.

Members of Parliament

Election results

Elections in the 1910s

Elections in the 1920s

Elections in the 1930s

Elections in the 1940s

Elections in the 1950s

Elections in the 1960s

Elections in the 1970s

References

See also 
 Former United Kingdom Parliament constituencies

Politics of Fife
Historic parliamentary constituencies in Scotland (Westminster)
Constituencies of the Parliament of the United Kingdom established in 1918
Constituencies of the Parliament of the United Kingdom disestablished in 1974
Politics of Dunfermline